The 1934 World Table Tennis Championships – Swaythling Cup (men's team) was the eighth edition of the men's team championship. The Championships were held in December 1933 but are officially listed as the 1934 Championships.  

Hungary dominated the tournament once again and won the gold medal with a perfect 11–0 match record. Austria and Czechoslovakia tied for silver and therefore no bronze was awarded.

Swaythling Cup final table

See also
List of World Table Tennis Championships medalists

References

-